Lewis William Mayo (born 19 March 2000) is a Scottish professional footballer who plays as a defender for Kilmarnock, on loan from  Rangers. Mayo has also previously played for Dunfermline Athletic and Partick Thistle.

Early life
Mayo was born the day after Rod Wallace scored a hat-trick that helped Rangers beat Motherwell 6–2 in March 2000. A Rangers fan from a young age, he excelled as a student and attained straight A's at High School.

Career
A highly-promising graduate of the Rangers youth academy, of which he was a member since the age of
10, Mayo signed a three-year deal with the Ibrox club in October 2018 under the management of Steven Gerrard and academy manager Graeme Murty. Mayo is described as a versatile player, however primarily operates in defensive positions.

Mayo featured and scored for Rangers in a 5–0 pre-season win over Oxford United at Ibrox and has also played in three Scottish Challenge Cup games for Rangers Colts, making it to the competition’s semi-final stage in 2020, after captaining the side for a 2–0 quarter-final win over Wrexham.

A Rangers fan since a young age, Mayo described the challenges of playing against players such as Jermain Defoe and Alfredo Morelos: "Jermain Defoe has been excellent as well because I play against him. He will tell me what I am doing well. It is hard and the thing is, it is either him or Alfredo Morelos in training, so you are not really getting a break. It is one or the other."

Loan moves
In the January 2020 transfer window, Mayo joined Scottish Championship side Partick Thistle on loan until the end of the season with the Maryhill side. Mayo made his debut in a 0–0 draw at home to Queen of the South, receiving a man of the match award for his performance. Due to the Coronavirus pandemic cutting short the season, Mayo’s loan was ended early as he returned to Rangers after making 3 appearances for The Jags, with his game time being limited due to being injured upon signing.

Mayo moved on a season-long loan to Scottish Championship side Dunfermline Athletic in September 2020.

He was loaned to Partick Thistle for a second time in July 2021. Mayo scored his first Thistle and career goal, scoring the winner in a 1-0 win over Hamilton Academical.

In June 2022, Mayo joined newly promoted Kilmarnock on a season-long loan.

References

External links

2000 births
Living people
Sportspeople from East Dunbartonshire
Footballers from Glasgow
Association football defenders
Partick Thistle F.C. players
Rossvale F.C. players
Rangers F.C. players
Scottish Professional Football League players
Scottish footballers
Scotland under-21 international footballers
Scotland youth international footballers
Dunfermline Athletic F.C. players
Kilmarnock F.C. players